Jakkaphan Kaewprom (born May 24, 1988) is a Thai professional footballer who plays as a midfielder for Thai League 1 club Ratchaburi and the Thailand national team.

Club career

BEC Tero Sasana
Jakkaphan started his professional career with BEC Tero Sasana. In BEC Tero he was converted to right back and right midfielder, because at that time there were enough center midfielders in the team.

Muangthong United
In 2011, he moved to Muangthong United where he played very well, he won the 2010 Thai Premier League. Buriram PEA which is now Buriram United bought him from Muangthong United.

Buriram United
He was convinced to play for Buriram because he is from Buriram. He suddenly became Buriram's main player, after scoring goals and assisted as well. He was a big part of Buriram's treble in 2011.

At the start of the 2013 Thai Premier League he picked up an injury on his ACL. Although he was injured Buriram extended his contract. He came back to field in the second leg of the 2013 Thai Premier League. His form dramatically came back to normal after his injury.

International career
On the back of performing extremely well in the Thailand Premier League, Jakkaphan was called up to the full national side in coach Peter Reid's first squad announcement. He was called up with 30 other players to the 2008 AFF Suzuki Cup.

His first international goal is from the match that Thailand won Palestine 1–0 in 2014 FIFA World Cup qualification (AFC). Jakkraphan played as a right back for Thailand against Australia in the 2014 FIFA World Cup qualification (AFC), in the following game his cross assisted Teerasil Dangda.

In 2013, he was called up to the national team by Surachai Jaturapattarapong to the 2015 AFC Asian Cup qualification. In October, 2013 he played a friendly match against Bahrain. He got injured early in the following match, and got substituted by Chatree Chimtalay.

International goals 
Scores and results list Thailand's goal tally first.

Style of play
Jakkaphan is described as a fast pace player who delivers good crosses and passes. Even though his main position is a midfielder, he could play right back and right midfielder very well.

Honours

Club
Muangthong United
 Thai Premier League (1): 2010

Buriram United
 Thai League 1 (7): 2011, 2013, 2014, 2015, 2017, 2018, 2021–22
 Thai FA Cup (5): 2011, 2012, 2013, 2015, 2021–22
 Thai League Cup (6): 2011, 2012, 2013, 2015, 2016, 2021–22 
 Thailand Champions Cup (1): 2019
 Kor Royal Cup (4): 2013, 2014, 2015, 2016
 Mekong Club Championship (1): 2015, 2016

Individual
 Thai Premier League Player of the Month (1): June 2014
 Thai League 1 Player of the Year (1): 2017
Thai League 1 Best XI: 2020–21

Royal decoration
 2009 -  Member (Fifth Class) of The Most Admirable Order of the Direkgunabhorn

References

External links
 
 

1988 births
Living people
Jakkaphan Kaewprom
Jakkaphan Kaewprom
Association football midfielders
Jakkaphan Kaewprom
Jakkaphan Kaewprom
Jakkaphan Kaewprom
Jakkaphan Kaewprom
Jakkaphan Kaewprom
Jakkaphan Kaewprom